This is a list of fish families sorted alphabetically by scientific name. There are 525 families in the list.


A - B - C - D - E - F -
G - H - I - J - K -
L - M - N - O - P - R - S - T - U - V - W - X - Y - Z

A 
Ab-Am - An-Ap - Ar-Au

Ab-Am 
 Abyssocottidae
 Acanthuridae
 Acestrorhynchidae
 Achiridae
 Achiropsettidae
 Acipenseridae
 Acropomatidae
 Adrianichthyidae
 Agonidae
 Akysidae
 Albulidae
 Alepisauridae
 Alepocephalidae
 Alestiidae
 Alopiidae
 Amarsipidae
 Ambassidae
 Amblycipitidae
 Amblyopsidae
 Amiidae
 Ammodytidae
 Amphiliidae

An-Ap 
 Anabantidae
 Anablepidae
 Anacanthobatidae
 Anarhichadidae
 Anguillidae
 Anomalopidae
 Anoplogastridae
 Anoplopomatidae
 Anostomidae
 Anotopteridae
 Antennariidae
 Aphredoderidae
 Aphyonidae
 Apistidae
 Aploactinidae
 Aplocheilidae
 Aplodactylidae
 Apogonidae
 Apteronotidae

Ar-Au 
 Aracanidae
 Arapaimidae
 Argentinidae
 Ariidae
 Ariommatidae
 Arripidae
 Artedidraconidae
 Aspredinidae
 Astroblepidae
 Ateleopodidae
 Atherinidae
 Atherinopsidae
 Auchenipteridae
 Aulopidae
 Aulorhynchidae
 Aulostomidae

B 
 Bagridae
 Balistidae
 Balitoridae
 Banjosidae
 Barbourisiidae
 Bathyclupeidae
 Bathydraconidae
 Bathylagidae
 Bathylutichthyidae
 Bathymasteridae
 Batrachoididae
 Bedotiidae
 Belonidae

 Bembridae
 Berycidae
 Blenniidae
 Bothidae
 Bovichtidae
 Brachaeluridae
 Brachionichthyidae
 Bramidae
 Bregmacerotidae
 Bythitidae

C 
Ca - Ce - Ch - Ci-Cu - Cy

Ca 
 Caesionidae
 Callanthiidae
 Callichthyidae
 Callionymidae
 Callorhinchidae
 Caproidae
 Caracanthidae
 Carangidae
 Carapidae
 Carcharhinidae
 Caristiidae
 Catostomidae
 Caulophrynidae

Ce
 Centracanthidae
 Centrarchidae
 Centriscidae
 Centrogenyidae
 Centrolophidae
 Centrophoridae
 Centrophrynidae
 Centropomidae
 Cepolidae
 Ceratiidae
 Ceratodontidae
 Cetomimidae
 Cetopsidae
 Cetorhinidae

Ch
 Chacidae
 Chaenopsidae
 Chaetodontidae
 Champsodontidae
 Chanidae
 Channichthyidae
 Channidae
 Characidae
 Chaudhuriidae
 Chaunacidae
 Cheilodactylidae
 Chiasmodontidae
 Chilodontidae
 Chimaeridae
 Chirocentridae
 Chironemidae
 Chlamydoselachidae
 Chlopsidae
 Chlorophthalmidae

Ci-Cu
 Cichlidae
 Cirrhitidae
 Citharidae
 Citharinidae
 Clariidae
 Clinidae
 Clupeidae
 Cobitidae
 Coiidae
 Colocongridae
 Comephoridae
 Congiopodidae
 Congridae
 Coryphaenidae
 Cottidae
 Cottocomephoridae
 Cranoglanididae
 Creediidae
 Crenuchidae
 Cryptacanthodidae
 Ctenoluciidae
 Curimatidae

Cy
 Cyclopteridae
 Cyematidae
 Cynodontidae
 Cynoglossidae
 Cyprinidae
 Cyprinodontidae

D
 Dactylopteridae
 Dactyloscopidae
 Dalatiidae
 Dasyatidae
 Dentatherinidae
 Denticipitidae
 Derichthyidae
 Diceratiidae
 Dichistiidae
 Dinolestidae
 Dinopercidae
 Diodontidae
 Diplomystidae
 Diretmidae
 Doradidae
 Draconettidae
 Drepaneidae
 Dussumieriidae

E 
 Echeneidae
 Echinorhinidae
 Elassomatidae
 Electrophoridae
 Eleginopidae
 Eleotridae
 Elopidae
 Embiotocidae
 Emmelichthyidae
 Engraulidae
 Enoplosidae
 Ephippidae
 Epigonidae
 Erethistidae
 Ereuniidae
 Erythrinidae
 Esocidae
 Euclichthyidae
 Eurypharyngidae
 Evermannellidae
 Exocoetidae

F 
 Fistulariidae
 Fundulidae

G
 Gadidae
 Galaxiidae
 Gasteropelecidae
 Gasterosteidae
 Gastromyzontidae
 Gempylidae
 Geotriidae
 Gerreidae
 Gibberichthyidae
 Gigantactinidae
 Giganturidae
 Ginglymostomatidae
 Glaucosomatidae
 Gnathanacanthidae
 Gobiesocidae
 Gobiidae
 Gonorynchidae
 Gonostomatidae
 Goodeidae
 Grammatidae
 Grammicolepididae
 Gymnarchidae
 Gymnotidae
 Gymnuridae
 Gyrinocheilidae

H
 Haemulidae
 Halosauridae
 Harpagiferidae
 Helogeneidae
 Helostomatidae
 Hemigaleidae
 Hemiodontidae
 Hemiramphidae
 Hemiscylliidae
 Hemitripteridae
 Hepsetidae
 Heptapteridae
 Heterenchelyidae
 Heterodontidae
 Heteropneustidae
 Hexagrammidae
 Hexanchidae
 Hexatrygonidae
 Himantolophidae
 Hiodontidae
 Hispidoberycidae
 Holocentridae
 Hoplichthyidae
 Hypopomidae
 Hypoptychidae

I 
 Icosteidae
 Ictaluridae
 Indostomidae
 Inermiidae
 Ipnopidae
 Istiophoridae

K 
 Kneriidae
 Kraemeriidae
 Kuhliidae
 Kurtidae
 Kyphosidae

L
La-Li - Lo-Lu

La-Li
 Labridae
 Labrisomidae
 Lactariidae
 Lamnidae
 Lampridae
 Latimeriidae
 Latridae
 Lebiasinidae
 Leiognathidae
 Lepidogalaxiidae
 Lepidosirenidae
 Lepisosteidae
 Leptobramidae
 Leptochariidae
 Leptochilichthyidae
 Leptoscopidae
 Lethrinidae
 Linophrynidae
 Liparidae

Lo-Lu
 Lobotidae
 Lophichthyidae
 Lophiidae
 Lophotidae
 Loricariidae
 Lotidae
 Luciocephalidae
 Lutjanidae
 Luvaridae

M
Ma-Mi - Mo-My

Ma-Mi
 Macrouridae
 Malacanthidae
 Malapteruridae
 Mastacembelidae
 Megachasmidae
 Megalomycteridae
 Megalopidae
 Melamphaidae
 Melanocetidae
 Melanonidae
 Melanotaeniidae
 Menidae
 Merlucciidae
 Microdesmidae
 Microstomatidae
 Mirapinnidae
 Mitsukurinidae

Mo-My
 Mochokidae
 Molidae
 Monacanthidae
 Monocentridae
 Monodactylidae
 Monognathidae
 Moridae
 Moringuidae
 Mormyridae
 Moronidae
 Mugilidae
 Mullidae
 Muraenesocidae
 Muraenidae
 Muraenolepididae
 Myctophidae
 Myliobatidae
 Myrocongridae
 Myxinidae

N
 Nandidae
 Narcinidae
 Nematistiidae
 Nematogenyidae
 Nemichthyidae
 Nemipteridae
 Neoceratiidae
 Neoscopelidae
 Neosebastidae
 Nettastomatidae
 Nomeidae
 Normanichthyidae
 Notacanthidae
 Notocheiridae
 Notograptidae
 Notopteridae
 Notosudidae
 Nototheniidae

O
 Odacidae
 Odontaspididae
 Odontobutidae
 Ogcocephalidae
 Olyridae
 Omosudidae
 Oneirodidae
 Ophichthidae
 Ophidiidae
 Opisthoproctidae
 Opistognathidae
 Oplegnathidae
 Orectolobidae
 Oreosomatidae
 Osmeridae
 Osphronemidae
 Osteoglossidae
 Ostraciidae
 Ostracoberycidae
 Oxynotidae

P
Pa-Pe - Ph-Pl - Po-Pr - Ps-Pt

Pa-Pe
 Pangasiidae
 Pantodontidae
 Parabembridae
 Parabrotulidae
 Parakysidae moved to Akysidae
 Paralepididae
 Paralichthyidae
 Parascorpididae
 Parascylliidae
 Paraulopidae
 Parazenidae
 Parodontidae
 Pataecidae
 Pegasidae
 Pempheridae
 Pentacerotidae
 Percichthyidae
 Percidae
 Perciliidae
 Percophidae
 Percopsidae
 Peristediidae
 Petromyzontidae

Ph-Pl
 Phallostethidae
 Pholidae
 Pholidichthyidae
 Phosichthyidae
 Phractolaemidae
 Phycidae
 Pimelodidae
 Pinguipedidae
 Platycephalidae
 Platytroctidae
 Plecoglossidae
 Plectrogenidae
 Plesiobatidae
 Plesiopidae
 Pleuronectidae
 Plotosidae

Po-Pr
 Poeciliidae
 Polycentridae
 Polymixiidae
 Polynemidae
 Polyodontidae
 Polyprionidae
 Polypteridae
 Pomacanthidae
 Pomacentridae
 Pomatomidae
 Potamotrygonidae
 Priacanthidae
 Pristidae
 Pristiophoridae
 Prochilodontidae
 Profundulidae
 Proscylliidae
 Protopteridae

Ps-Pt
 Psettodidae
 Pseudaphritidae
 Pseudocarchariidae
 Pseudochromidae
 Pseudomugilidae
 Pseudopimelodidae
 Pseudotriakidae
 Pseudotrichonotidae
 Psilorhynchidae
 Psychrolutidae
 Ptereleotridae
 Ptilichthyidae

R
 Rachycentridae
 Radiicephalidae
 Rajidae
 Regalecidae
 Retropinnidae
 Rhamphichthyidae
 Rhamphocottidae
 Rhincodontidae
 Rhinobatidae
 Rhinochimaeridae
 Rhyacichthyidae
 Rivulidae
 Rondeletiidae

S
Sa-Sc - Se-St - Su-Sy

Sa-Sc
 Saccopharyngidae
 Salangidae
 Salmonidae
 Samaridae
 Scaridae
 Scatophagidae
 Schilbeidae
 Schindleriidae
 Sciaenidae
 Scoloplacidae
 Scomberesocidae
 Scombridae
 Scombrolabracidae
 Scombropidae
 Scopelarchidae
 Scophthalmidae
 Scorpaenidae
 Scyliorhinidae
 Scytalinidae

Se-St
 Sebastidae
 Serranidae
 Serrasalmidae
 Serrivomeridae
 Setarchidae
 Siganidae
 Sillaginidae
 Siluridae
 Sisoridae
 Soleidae
 Solenostomidae
 Sparidae
 Sphyraenidae
 Sphyrnidae
 Squalidae
 Squatinidae
 Stegostomatidae
 Stephanoberycidae
 Sternoptychidae
 Sternopygidae
 Stichaeidae
 Stomiidae
 Stromateidae
 Stylephoridae

Su-Sy
 Sundasalangidae
 Symphysanodontidae
 Synanceiidae
 Synaphobranchidae
 Synbranchidae
 Syngnathidae
 Synodontidae

T
 Telmatherinidae
 Terapontidae
 Tetrabrachiidae
 Tetragonuridae
 Tetraodontidae
 Tetrarogidae
 Thaumatichthyidae
 Torpedinidae
 Toxotidae
 Trachichthyidae
 Trachinidae
 Trachipteridae
 Triacanthidae
 Triacanthodidae
 Triakidae
 Trichiuridae
 Trichodontidae
 Trichomycteridae
 Trichonotidae
 Triglidae
 Triodontidae
 Tripterygiidae

U
 Umbridae
 Uranoscopidae
 Urolophidae

V 
 Valenciidae
 Veliferidae

X 
 Xenisthmidae
 Xiphiidae

Z 
 Zanclidae
 Zaniolepididae
 Zaproridae
 Zeidae
 Zenionidae
 Zoarcidae

See also 

 
Families